Hydnum ellipsosporum is a species of fungus in the family Hydnaceae that was described from Germany in 2004. It differs from H. repandum by the shape and length of its spores, which are ellipsoid and measure 9–11 by 6–7.5 µm.

References

External links 
 

Fungi described in 2004
Fungi of Europe
ellipsosporum